Govah Kuh (also Romanized as Govāh Kūh; also known as Govākūh) is a village in Dezhgan Rural District, in the Central District of Bandar Lengeh County, Hormozgan Province, Iran. At the 2006 census, its population was 113, in 25 families.

References 

Populated places in Bandar Lengeh County